The State Stalin Prize, usually called the Stalin Prize, existed from 1941 to 1954, although some sources give a termination date of 1952. 
It essentially played the same role; therefore upon the establishment of the USSR State Prize, the diplomas and badges of the recipients of Stalin Prize were changed to that of USSR State Prize.

Recipients of the Stalin Prize in science and engineering by year

1941 

 Adela Rosenthal: mathematics 
 Abram Alikhanov: physics
 Alexander E. Braunstein: biochemistry
 Nikolai Burdenko: neurosurgery
 Mikhail Gurevich: aeronautical engineering
 Sergey Ilyushin: aeronautical engineering
 Aleksandr Khinchin: mathematics
 Andrey Kolmogorov: mathematics
 Semyon Lavochkin: aeronautical engineering
 Mikhail Loginov: artillery design
 Trofim Lysenko: biology
 Dmitry Maksutov: astronomic optics
 Vladimir Obruchev: geology
 Evgeny Paton: electrical welding
 Nikolai Polikarpov: aeronautical engineering
 Nikolay Semyonov: chemical physics
 Sergei Sobolev: mathematics
 Alexey Shchusev: architecture
 Alexander Sergeyevich Yakovlev: aeronautical engineering
 Ivan Matveyevich Vinogradov: mathematics
 Semyon Volfkovich: chemistry
 Nikolai Ponomarev: astronomic optics
 Alexander Bogomolets: medicine

1942 

 Aleksandr Danilovich Aleksandrov: mathematics
 : tank engineer
 Ivan Grave: artillery, for his work Ballistics of Semiclosed Space
 Sergey Ilyushin: aeronautical engineering
 Mstislav Keldysh: mathematics
 Isaak Kikoin: physics
 Mikhail Koshkin: tank engineer
 Leonid Isaakovich Mandelstam: physics
 Sergei Rubinstein: psychology
 Aleksandr Aleksandrovich Shmuk: biochemistry
 Alexander Vishnevsky: surgeon
 Alexander Sergeyevich Yakovlev: aeronautical engineering
 Nikolay Zelinsky work on organic chemistry
 Ivan Bardin: metallurgist
 Ivan Plotnikov: inventor of artificial leather kirza
 Igor Kurchatov: physicist (1st degree; with a group of Ioffe Institute)

1943 

 Nicholas Astrov: tank engineer
 Aleksandr Blagonravov: tank engineer
 Zinaida Vissarionovna Ermol'eva: biochemistry
 Sergey Ilyushin: aeronautical engineering
 Ivan Knunyants: chemistry
 Feodosy Krasovsky: astronomy
 Semyon Lavochkin: aeronautical engineering
 Nikolai Nikolaevich Polikarpov: aeronautical engineering
 Sergey Ivanovich Vavilov: physics
 Vladimir Vernadsky: mineralogy and geochemistry
 Yakov Zeldovich: 2nd degree, physics – for works on combustion and detonation
 Mustafa Topchubashov: general surgeon

1944 
Laureates for this year were officially announced in 1946.

1945 
Laureates for this year were officially announced in 1946

1946 

 Pavel Alekseyevich Cherenkov: physics
 Saint Luke: Medicine
 Viktor Hambardzumyan: astrophysics
 Sergey Ilyushin: aeronautical engineering
 Mstislav Keldysh: mathematics
 Lev Landau: physics
 Semyon Lavochkin: aeronautical engineering
 Lazar Lyusternik: mathematics
 Dmitri Maksutov: 1st degree, astronomic optics
 Anatoly Ivanovich Malcev: 2nd degree, for the research on Lie groups
 Vasily Sergeevich Nemchinov: mathematics
 Pelageya Polubarinova-Kochina: mathematics
 Alexander Sergeyevich Yakovlev: aeronautical engineering
 Sergey Ivanovich Vavilov: physics
 : immunology
 Yevgeny Tarle: historian
 : biochemistry
 Nikolay Zelinsky: work on chemistry of proteins
 Konstantin Petrzhak and Georgy Flyorov: physics (2nd degree; for discovery of spontaneous fission)
 Mark Veyngerov for developing of Express Optic-Acoustical Gas Analysis.
 Valentin Felixovich Voyno-Yasenetsky: medicine
 Anatoly Savin: technology
 Yusif Mammadaliyev: chemistry
 Aliashraf Abdulhuseyn oglu Alizade: geologist
 Natalia Uzhviy: acress

1947 

 Manfred von Ardenne: for a table-top electron microscope
 Georgy Beriev: aeronautical engineering
 Nikolay Bogolyubov: mathematics
 : radiocommunication engineer
 Mikhail Gurevich: aeronautical engineering
 Sergey Ilyushin: aeronautical engineering
 Artem Mikoyan: aeronautical engineering
 Alexander Sergeyevich Yakovlev: aeronautical engineering
 Alexei Vasilievich Shubnikov: 2nd degree, for the discovery and study of a new type of piezoelectrics, the results of which are set out in the monograph "Piezoelectric textures" (1946)

1948 

 Yekaterina Alexandrovna Ankinovich: 3rd degree, for "geological research and development of the Nikolaevsky polymetal deposit"
 Nikolai Bernstein: neurophysiology
 : geology
 Mikhail Gurevich: aeronautical engineering
 Artem Mikoyan: aeronautical engineering
 Arseny Mironov: aeronautical engineering
 Semyon Lavochkin: aeronautical engineering
 Alexander Sergeyevich Yakovlev: aeronautical engineering

1949 

 Mikhail Gurevich: aircraft engineering
 Mikhail Kalashnikov: engineering
 Leonid Kantorovich: mathematics
 : radiochemistry
 Artem Mikoyan: aircraft engineering
 Nikolaus Riehl: first class, for contributions to the Soviet atomic bomb project
 Yakov Borisovich Zel'dovich (Яков Борисович Зельдович): 1st degree, physics – for special works (actually, for nuclear technology)
 Anatoly Savin
 Max Taitz: aircraft flight testing
 Natalia Uzhviy: acress

1950 

 Viktor Hambardzumyan: astrophysics
 Sergey Ilyushin: aeronautical engineering
 Vladimir Obruchev: geology
 Aleksei Pogorelov: mathematics
 Dmitri Skobeltsyn: physics
 Ilia Vekua: mathematics
 Alexei Vasilievich Shubnikov: 3rd degree, for the development of equipment and technology for the production of rubies

1951 

 Heinz Barwich: 2nd degree, physics
 Gustav Ludwig Hertz: 2nd degree, physics
 Yuri Krutkov: 2nd degree, physics
 Anatoly Savin
 Peter Adolf Thiessen: 1st degree, for uranium enrichment techniques
 Boris Vannikov: administration of Soviet nuclear program
 Sergey Ivanovich Vavilov: physics
 Viktor Vinogradov: philology
 Yakov Borisovich Zel'dovich: 1st degree, physics – for special works
 Pavel Iosifovich Androsov: 2nd degree, medicine – for the anastomotic coupler
 Vladimir Veksler: physics
 Natalia Uzhviy: acress

1952 

 Pavel Cherenkov: physics
 Sergey Ilyushin: aeronautical engineering
 Feodosy Krasovsky: astronomer and geodesist
 Leon Theremin: science for inventing eavesdropping equipment
 Sergey Ivanovich Vavilov: physics
 Ivan Efremov, for Taphonomy and Geological Chronology
 : 2nd degree, for the monograph Stress Concentration around Holes
 Ilya Ilyich Chernyaev: 1st degree, chemistry
 Boris K. Schischkin and two others; for the Flora of the USSR
 Lev Landau, Naum Meiman, Isaak Khalatnikov: 2nd degree, calculations for the atomic bomb project
 Sergey Mergelyan: mathematics

1953 

 Manfred von Ardenne: 1st degree, for contributions to the Soviet atomic bomb project
 Nikolay Bogolyubov: physics
 Vitaly Ginzburg: 1st degree, physics
 Eduard Haken: music
 Bruno Pontecorvo: physics
 Max Taitz: cruise missiles flight testing
 Vasily Vladimirov: mathematics
 Yakov Borisovich Zel'dovich: 1st degree, physics – for special works
 Dmitri Lyudvigovich Tomashevich: aircraft design

1954 

 Andrei Sakharov: 1st degree, physics
 V. Alexandrov (Александров В. В.), Yu. Bazilevsky (Базилевский Ю. Я.), D. Zhuchkov (Жучков Д. А.), I. Lygin (Лыгин И. Ф.), G. Markov (Марков Г. Я.), B. Melnikov (Мельников Б. Ф.), G. Prokudayev (Прокудаев Г. М.), B. Rameyev, N. Trubnikov (Трубников Н. Б.), A. Tsygankin (Цыганкин А. П.), Yu. Shcherbakov (Щербаков Ю. Ф.) and L. Larionova (Ларионова Л.А.)Strela computer development team: 1st degree
 Igor Tamm: physics
 Igor Kurchatov: physics

Recipients of the Stalin Prize in literature and arts by year

1941 

 Grigori Aleksandrov, Isaak Dunayevsky, and Lyubov Orlova: film Circus (1936)
 Grigori Aleksandrov, Nikolai Erdman, Isaak Dunayevsky, Lyubov Orlova, and Igor Ilyinsky: film Volga-Volga (1938)
 Hamo Beknazarian, Avet Avetisyan, and Hrachia Nersisyan: film Zangezur (1938)
 Mikheil Chiaureli and Spartak Bagashvili: film Arsena (1937)
 Mikheil Chiaureli and Mikheil Gelovani: film The Great Dawn (1938)
 Mark Donskoy and Varvara Massalitinova: films The Childhood of Maxim Gorky (1938) and On His Own (1939)
 Alexander Dovzhenko, Yevgeny Samoylov, and Ivan Skuratov: film Shchors (1939)
 Efim Dzigan: film The Sailors of Kronstadt (1936)
 Efim Dzigan and Vsevolod Vishnevsky: film If War Comes Tomorrow (1938)
 Sergei Eisenstein, Pyotr Pavlenko, Nikolai Cherkasov, and Andrei Abrikosov: film Alexander Nevsky (1938)
 Fridrikh Ermler, Nikolay Bogolyubov, and Aleksandr Zrazhevsky: film The Great Citizen (1938–1939)
 Sergei Gerasimov and Tamara Makarova: film The New Teacher (1939)
 Yevgeni Ivanov-Barkov, Alty Karliyev, and Nina Alisova: film Dursun (1941)
 Iosif Kheifits and Aleksandr Zarkhi: film Baltic Deputy (1937)
 Grigori Kozintsev, Leonid Trauberg, and Boris Chirkov: films The Youth of Maxim (1935), The Return of Maxim (1937), and The Vyborg Side (1939)
 Leonid Lukov and Pavel Nilin: film A Great Life (Part I) (1940)
 Vladimir Petrov, Nikolai Simonov, and Mikhail Zharov: film Peter the First (1937–1938)
 Vsevolod Pudovkin, Mikhail Doller, Boris Livanov, and Aleksandr Khanov: film Minin and Pozharsky (1939)
 Vsevolod Pudovkin, Mikhail Doller, Nikolai Cherkasov-Sergeyev, and Aleksandr Khanov: film Suvorov (1941)
 Ivan Pyryev, Nikolai Kryuchkov, and Marina Ladynina: film Tractor-Drivers (1939)
 Yuli Raizman, Ivan Peltser, and Nikolai Dorokhin: film Last Night (1937)
 Gerbert Rappaport, Aleksandr Ivanovsky, Sergei Lemeshev, and Erast Garin: film Musical Story (1940)
 Mikhail Romm, Aleksei Kapler, Boris Shchukin, and Nikolai Okhlopkov: films Lenin in October (1937) and Lenin in 1918 (1939)
 Nikoloz Shengelaia: film Eliso (1928)
 Nikoloz Shengelaia and Nato Vachnadze: film Orange Valley (1937)
 Georgi Vasilyev, Sergei Vasilyev, and Boris Babochkin: film Chapaev (1939)
 Sergei Yutkevich and Leonid Lyubashevsky: film Yakov Sverdlov (1940)
 Aleksandr Zguridi, Gleb Troyanski, and Boris Dolin: documentary film In the Depths of the Sea (1938)
 Aleksandr Zguridi and Gleb Troyanski: documentary film Force of Life (1940)
 Ilya Kopalin: documentary film On Danube (1940)
 Uzeyir Hajibeyov: Ker oghlu, opera
 Aram Khachaturian: Violin Concerto
 Nikolai Myaskovsky: Symphony No. 21
 Mark Reizen: opera singer, bass
 Sergei Sergeyev-Tsensky: literature
 Yuri Shaporin: On the Field of Kulikovo, cantata
 Dmitri Shostakovich: Piano Quintet
 Aleksey Shchusev: architecture
 Mikhail Aleksandrovich Sholokhov: literature
 Aleksey Nikolayevich Tolstoy: literature, for Peter I
 Aleksandr Tvardovsky: literature
 Olga Lepeshinskaya: ballet
 Vera Mukhina: sculptor
 Natalia Shpiller: opera singer
 Samad Vurgun: poet, dramatist; for Vagif play

1942 

 Tikhon Khrennikov: music to the film The Swineherd and the Shepherd
 Dmitri Shostakovich: Symphony No. 7
 Ilya Ehrenburg: literature
 David Fyodorovich Oistrakh: violinist

1943 

 Wanda Wasilewska, for her novel The Rainbow
 Mukhtar Ashrafi: Symphony No. 1 Heroic
 Aram Khachaturian: Gayaneh Ballet
 Sergei Prokofiev: Piano Sonata No. 7
 Vissarion Shebalin: String Quartet No. 5
 Aleksey Nikolayevich Tolstoy: literature, for The Road to Calvary
 Pavel Bazhov: literature, for The Malachite Box
 Margarita Aliger: for poetry, Zoya

1944 
The awards for this year were given in 1946

1945 
The awards for this year were given in 1946

1946 

 Rza Tahmasib: cinema, for The Cloth-Peddler (Arshin Mal Alan) film
 Rashid Behbudov: singer and actor, for Asker role in Arshin Mal Alan
 Arnold Azrikan: dramatic tenor, Otello
 Sergei Aslamazyan: cellist
 Mikola Bazhan: literature, for In the Days of War (1945?)
 Yuri Bilibin: geology
 Sergei Eisenstein: cinema, for Ivan the Terrible, Part I
 Alexander Fadeyev: literature, for The Young Guard (1st edition, 1945)
 Samuil Feinberg: Piano Concerto No. 2
 Emil Gilels: pianist
 Reinhold Glière: Concerto for voice and orchestra
 Dmitri Kabalevsky: String Quartet No. 2
 Gara Garayev: The Motherland, opera
 Jovdat Hajiyev: The Motherland, opera
 Veniamin Kaverin: literature, for The Two Captains
 Aram Khachaturian: Symphony No. 2
 Tikhon Khrennikov: At 6 p.m. after the War, music from the film
 Boris Liatoshinsky: Ukrainian Quintet
 Samuil Marshak: literature, for the play Twelve Months
 Peretz Markish: literature
 Vera Inber: poetry
 Sulamith Messerer: ballet choreography
 Nikolai Miaskovsky: String Quartet No. 9 – Cello Concerto
 Vano Muradeli: Symphony No. 2
 Vera Panova: literature, for Sputniki
 Gavriil Nikolayevich Popov: Symphony No. 2
 Sergei Orlov: Sculpture
 Sergei Prokofiev: Symphony No. 5 – Piano Sonata No. 8 – Cinderella Ballet
 Alexander Prokofyev: poetry, for the 1944 poem "Rossiya"
 Yuri Shaporin: Story of the Battle for the Russian Land
 Andrei Shtogarenko: My Ukraine, symphony
 Georgi Sviridov: Piano Trio
 Aleksey Shchusev: architecture
 Vikenty Veresaev: literature
 Yevgeny Vuchetich: sculpture
 Stepan Malkhasyants: philologist, for Armenian Explanatory Dictionary
 Boris Gorbatov: literature
 Eugen Kapp: music composition

1947 

 Salomėja Nėris: poetry (posthumously)
 Sergei Prokofiev: Sonata No. 1 for violin and piano
 Vissarion Shebalin: Moscow, cantata
 Sergey Nikiforovich Vasilenko: Mirandoline Suite
 Vera Panova: literature, for Kruzhilikha
 Aleksandr Tvardovsky: literature
 Yevgeny Vuchetich, sculpture
 Andrey Vyshinsky: Theory of Judicial Proofs
 Pyotr Pavlenko: literature, for Happiness

1948 

 Boris Asafiev: Monograph on Glinka
 Reinhold Glière: String Quartet No. 4
 Gara Garayev: Leyli and Majnun, symphonic poem
 Ilya Ehrenburg: literature
 Anatoly Rybakov: literature, for The Dagger
 Aleksey Shchusev, architecture
 Volodymyr Sosyura: poetry
 Nikolai Virta
 Yevgeny Vuchetich: sculpture
 The crew of the film Secret Agent
 Zinovy Moiseevich Vilensky: sculpture
 Vladimir Fedorovich Popov: literature, for Steel and Slag
 Arkady Filippenko: music, for Second String Quartet
 Adil Isgandarov: theatre and film director, actor

1949 

 Fikret Amirov: Symphonic Mughams
 Alexander Arutiunian: The Motherland, cantata
 Vasiliy Nikolaevich Azhaev: literature, for Far From Moscow
 Fyodor Fedorovsky: scenic design
 Sergei Gerasimov, Vladimir Rapoport, Vladimir Ivanov, Inna Makarova, Nonna Mordyukova, Sergei Gurzo, Lyudmila Shagalova, and Viktor Khokhryakov for the film The Young Guard (1948)
 Feodor Vasilyevich Gladkov: literature, for Story of My Childhood (1949?)
 Dmitri Kabalevsky: Violin Concerto
 Yuri Grigorievich Laptev: 3rd class, literature, for Zarya (1948)
 Mikhail Lukonin: "The Working Day", poem
 Vera Panova: literature, for The Bright Shore
 Faina Ranevskaya: for outstanding creative achievements on theater stage
 Ottilia Reizman: 2nd degree, for the film The Guardian of the World (1948)
 Fyodor Pavlovich Reshetnikov: art
 Sandro Shanshiashvili: for his poetry and plays
 Yevgeny Vuchetich: sculpture
 Ivan Vasilenko: literature, for The Little Star
 Tugelbay Sydykbekov: 3rd class, Kyrgyz writer of prose fiction, for his novel Bizdin zamandyn kišileri ("People of our time", 1947)
 Eugen Kapp: music composition

1950 

 Leonid Baratov: opera director
 Reinhold Glière: The Bronze Horseman
 Nikolai Myaskovsky: Sonata No. 2 for cello and piano
 Dmitri Shostakovich: Song of the Forests – The Fall of Berlin for chorus
 Yevgeny Vuchetich: sculpture
 Dimitri Arakishvili: composer
 Vadim Sobko: for the novel Guarantee of Peace
 Vasily Yefanov: painter
 Galiya Izmaylova: 2nd degree, ballerina
 Alykul Osmonov: poetry; for his efforts to modernize Kyrgyz literature
 Jahangir Jahangirov: composer, conductor and choirmaster
 Mirza Ibrahimov: writer, playwright
 Mehdi Huseyn: writer and critic; for Absheron novel (1947)
 Bulbul: opera tenor, folk music performer, and one of the founders of vocal arts and national musical theatre
 Sviatoslav Richter: musician
 Suleyman Rustam: for collection of poems Two shores

1951 

 Osip Abdulov: 2nd degree, actor
 Arno Babadzhanian: Heroic Ballad
 Vladimir Belyayev: literature for The Old Fortress: A Trilogy
 Sergei Bondarchuk: Taras Shevchenko
 Nikolai Cherkasov: for the film Alexander Popov (the role of Alexander Popov).
 Isaak Dunaevsky: Music to the film The Kuban' Cossacks
 Gevorg Emin: book of poetry New Road
 Bruno Freindlich: for the film Alexander Popov (the role of Guglielmo Marconi).
 German Galynin: Epic Poem
 Edouard Grikurov: conductor (music)
 Aleksandras Gudaitis-Guzevičius, book Kalvio Ignoto teisybė (The truth of blacksmith Ignotas)
 Dmitri Kabalevsky: Taras's Family, opera
 Jan Kapr: New Czechoslovakia, film music
 Nikolai Myaskovsky: Symphony No. 27 – String Quartet No. 13
 Sergei Prokofiev: On Guard for Peace, oratorio
 Vsevolod Pudovkin, Anatoli Golovnya, Vissarion Shebalin, and Vladimir Belokurov: film Zhukovsky (1950)
 Faina Ranevskaya: for the film U nih est' Rodina (They Have Their Motherland)
 Ottilia Reizman: 3rd degree for the film Glory of Labor (1949)
 Fyodor Pavlovich Reshetnikov: art (second time)
 Anatoly Rybakov: literature
 Otar Taktakishvili: Symphony No. 1
 Teofilis Tilvytis, poem Usnynė
 Yuri Trifonov: literature, for Students
 Suleiman Yudakov: composer, musician (composed the Tajik National Anthem)
 Ding Ling: 2nd degree, literature for The Sun Shines Over Sanggan River
 Niyazi: conductor, and composer of the renowned symphonic mugam Rast
 Rasul Rza: literature
 Mstislav Rostropovich: musician

1952 

 Ashot Satian: vocal-symphony poem Songs of Ararat Valley (1950)
 Jovdat Hajiyev: For Peace, symphonic poem
 Soltan Hajibeyov
 Mukhtar Ashrafi
 Pavel Necheporenko: distinguished performance on balalaika
 Yuri Shaporin: romances for voice and piano
 Dmitri Shostakovich: Ten Poems for Chorus opus 88
 Andrei Shtogarenko: In Memory of Lesya Ukrainka, symphonic suite
 Juhan Smuul: literature
 Otar Taktakishvili: Piano Concerto no 1
 Aleksey Shchusev: architecture
 Antanas Venclova: literature, Rinktinė (selected works)
 Viktor Arkadyevich Bely: music composition
 Eugen Kapp: music composition
 Silva Kaputikyan: literature
 Marie Podvalová: music performance

References

Stalin Prize
Soviet Union-related lists
Stalin Prize winners